The Niagara District Junior B Hockey League was a Canadian Junior ice hockey league in the Golden Horseshoe of Ontario from 1954 until 1979.  The league was a part of the Ontario Hockey Association of the Canadian Amateur Hockey Association and was eligible for the Sutherland Cup.

History
The Niagara District Junior B Hockey League was founded in 1957.  In 1974, many teams in the area broke off and formed the Golden Horseshoe Junior Hockey League.  The Niagara District League survived until 1979, when it was divided between the Golden Horseshoe League and the Niagara & District Junior C Hockey League.

Teams
Burlington Mohawks
Dunnville Terriers
Fort Erie Meteors
Hamilton Mountain Bees
Niagara Falls Canucks
Niagara-on-the-Lake Lakers
Port Colborne Sailors
St. Catharines Falcons
Simcoe Storm
Stamford Bruins
Thorold Paper Bees
Welland Cougars

Niagara District Champions
1958 Welland Brookies
1959 St. Catharines Falcons
1960 St. Catharines Falcons
1961 Welland Brookies
1962
1963 Burlington Mohawks
1964 Burlington Mohawks
1965 Hamilton Bees
1966 Hamilton Bees
1967 Stamford Bruins
1968 Thorold Jaycees
1969 Hamilton Mountain Bees
1970 Hamilton Mountain Bees
1971 Hamilton Mountain Bees
1972 St. Catharines Falcons
1973 Hamilton Mountain Bees
1974 Hamilton Red Wings
1975 Niagara Falls Canucks
1976 Niagara Falls Canucks
1977 Niagara Falls Canucks
1978 Welland Cougars
1979 Fort Erie Meteors

External links
Golden Horseshoe Junior B Website
OHA Website

Defunct ice hockey leagues in Ontario